AD Smith (born May 21, 1977) is an American basketball coach and former professional player. He is an assistant coach for the girls' basketball team at Willamette High School in Eugene, Oregon. Smith played college basketball for the Oregon Ducks.

Smith played basketball at Winston Churchill High School in Eugene, Oregon, where he was named the state's Player of the Year in 1995.

Smith played professionally in Austria, Luxembourg and Belgium. He played for the Perth Wildcats of the Australian National Basketball League (NBL) during the 2001–02 season. Smith averaged 2.8 points and 1.7 rebounds in 7 games played for the Wildcats. He played for FC Mulhouse Basket of the French LNB Pro B from 2004 to 2006.

References

External links
College statistics

1977 births
Living people
American expatriate basketball people in Australia
American expatriate basketball people in Austria
American expatriate basketball people in Belgium
American expatriate basketball people in France
American expatriate basketball people in Luxembourg
American men's basketball coaches
American men's basketball players
Basketball players from Oregon
Centers (basketball)
Forwards (basketball)
High school basketball coaches in Oregon
Oregon Ducks men's basketball players
Perth Wildcats players